Rachel Jane Nickell (23 November 1968 – 15 July 1992) was a British woman who was stabbed to death on Wimbledon Common in south-west London on 15 July 1992. The initial police investigation of the crime resulted in the arrest in controversial circumstances of an innocent man, who was acquitted. Her killer, Robert Napper, was identified by a later police investigation and convicted in 2008.

Nickell was walking with her two-year-old son on Wimbledon Common when she was stabbed 49 times in the neck and torso and died at the scene. A lengthy police investigation to find the perpetrator followed, during which a suspect was wrongfully charged and later acquitted—before the case went cold.

In 2002, with more advanced forensic techniques, the case was reopened. On 18 December 2008, Robert Napper pleaded guilty to Nickell's manslaughter on the grounds of diminished responsibility. Napper, who was already detained at high-security Broadmoor Hospital in Berkshire for a 1993 double murder, was ordered to be detained there indefinitely.

Killing 
At the time of her death, Nickell was living near Wimbledon Common with partner André Hanscombe and their two-year-old son, Alexander Louis. Nickell was 23 years old at the time of her death. On the morning of 15 July 1992, she and Alexander were walking their dog on Wimbledon Common. Whilst passing through a secluded area of the common, Nickell was attacked. An assailant killed her by repeatedly stabbing and slashing her with a knife, then sexually assaulted her. The assailant fled the scene, leaving Alex physically unharmed in the vicinity. A passer-by found Alex clinging to his mother's body repeating the words "Wake up, Mummy".
 
In a television interview on 7 September 2021 with Lorraine Kelly, discussing the documentary Death on the Common: My Mother's Murder, Alex Hanscombe said after his mother had been attacked, he said to her three times "wake up, Mummy" before realising she was "gone" and not playing. He then walked into a clearing on the common, where people saw that he was covered in blood and therefore discovered his mother's body.

Investigation
Officers of the Metropolitan Police undertook the investigation, under pressure to find the perpetrator by press coverage and public outrage at the circumstances of the murder. Thirty-two men were questioned in connection with the killing; the investigation quickly targeted Colin Stagg, a man from Roehampton who was known to walk his dog on the Common. As there was no forensic evidence linking him to the scene, the police asked Paul Britton, a criminal psychologist, to create an offender profile of the killer. They decided that he fitted the profile and asked the psychologist to assist with designing a covert operation, code-named Operation Edzell, to see whether he would eliminate or implicate himself. This operation was later criticised by the media and the trial judge as effectively a "honeytrap".

Operation Edzell
An undercover policewoman from the Metropolitan Police Special Operations Group (SO10) contacted Stagg, posing as a friend of a woman with whom he used to be in contact via a lonely hearts' column. Over five months, she attempted to obtain information from him by feigning a romantic interest, meeting him, speaking to him on the telephone and exchanging letters containing sexual fantasies. During a meeting in Hyde Park, they spoke about the Nickell homicide; he later claimed that he had only played along with the topic because he wanted to pursue the romance. Profiler Paul Britton later said that he disagreed with use of the fantasy-filled letters and knew nothing of them until after they had been sent.

The undercover officer won Stagg's confidence and drew out fantasies from him that psychologist Paul Britton interpreted as "violent", but he did not admit to the killing. Police released a taped conversation between the police officer and him in which she claimed to enjoy hurting people, to which he mumbled, "Please explain, as I live a quiet life. If I have disappointed you, please don't dump me. Nothing like this has happened to me before". When she went on to say, "If only you had done the Wimbledon Common murder, if only you had killed her, it would be all right", he replied, "I'm terribly sorry, but I haven't". Stagg was nevertheless arrested and charged on the basis of claims that he had described aspects of the murder scene that only the killer would have known.

Trial
When the case reached the Old Bailey in September 1994, Mr Justice Ognall ruled that the police had shown "excessive zeal" and had tried to incriminate Stagg by "deceptive conduct of the grossest kind". He excluded all the entrapment evidence on the grounds that Stagg's descriptions of the murder were not nearly as close to the reality as the police had maintained. With no other evidence to present, the prosecution withdrew its case and Stagg was acquitted.

Keith Pedder, the case's lead detective, received heavy public criticism. Even after Stagg was (rightfully as it later turned out) cleared of the murder of Nickell, Pedder continued over subsequent years to promote his theory that Stagg was guilty. He told an ITV Real Crime documentary in 2001:

After Stagg's acquittal, Pedder took early retirement from the police. He later faced corruption charges, but the case was thrown out by the judge in a pre-trial hearing on the grounds of insufficient evidence.

Reinvestigation and conviction

Cold case review
Every year on the anniversary of the killing Scotland Yard came under pressure for progress. In the late 1990s, Nickell's murder was re-investigated as part of Operation Enigma, which was a national cross-force investigation into the unsolved murders of 207 women. Under new management, detectives began to collate evidence and files related to the case from 2000.

In 2002, ten years after the killing, Scotland Yard used a cold case review team, which used refined DNA techniques only recently made available. A small team of officers and retired veteran investigators analysed statements from witnesses, reassessed files on a number of potential suspects and examined the possibility that the case was linked to other crimes. Officers compared the injuries suffered by Nickell with other attacks and consulted forensic scientists about improvements in DNA matching. In July 2003, reports surfaced that, after 18 months of tests on Nickell's clothes, police had found a male DNA sample which did not match her boyfriend or son. The sample at the time was insufficient to confirm an identity, but was large enough to rule out suspects.

Robert Napper

In July 2006, the Scotland Yard team interviewed convicted murderer Robert Napper for two days at Broadmoor. Napper, 40 years old at that time, had been diagnosed as having paranoid schizophrenia and Asperger syndrome and had been held at the secure institution for more than ten years. He had been convicted of the murder of Samantha Bisset and her four-year-old daughter, Jazmine, in November 1993, sixteen months after Nickell's homicide. On 28 November 2007, Napper was charged with Nickell's murder. He appeared at City of Westminster Magistrates' Court on 4 December 2007, where he was granted bail on condition he remained at Broadmoor psychiatric hospital until another hearing on 20 December 2007. On 24 January 2008, he pleaded not guilty to Nickell's murder and the trial started on 11 November 2008. On 18 December 2008, at the Old Bailey, Napper pleaded guilty to the manslaughter of Rachel Nickell on the grounds of diminished responsibility. Mr Justice Griffith Williams said that Napper would be detained indefinitely at Broadmoor because he was "a very dangerous man". It is unlikely he will ever be released. At the same time, Stagg received a public apology from the Metropolitan Police for their previous involvement and prosecution of him in regard to the Nickell murder investigation.

Aftermath
An internal review estimated that the pursuit had cost the public £3 million and that vital scientific information had been missed.

Stagg sued the police for damages totalling £1 million following the fourteen months he spent in custody. He has co-written and published two books about the case: Who Really Killed Rachel? (with novelist David Kessler) and, more recently, Pariah (with journalist Ted Hynds), the latter being published on the same day as the real culprit's appearance in court to enter a plea. In January 2007, the Home Office confirmed that Stagg would receive compensation for wrongful prosecution, with the amount to be set by an independent assessor. On 13 August 2008, it was announced that the compensation was £706,000.

The undercover officer involved in the attempt to obtain evidence in the original investigation by befriending him took early retirement from the Metropolitan Police force in 1998. With the support of the Police Federation, she sued the Metropolitan Police for damages arising from the investigation. In 2001, shortly before it was due to be heard, her case was settled out of court and she received £125,000. Her solicitor said: "The willingness of the Metropolitan Police to pay substantial damages must indicate their recognition that she sustained serious psychiatric injury". The payout was widely criticised by various sources, particularly as Nickell's son had been granted £22,000 (less than a fifth of the amount paid to the undercover detective) from the Criminal Injuries Compensation Authority.

The criminal psychologist involved with the investigation was charged with professional misconduct by the British Psychological Society, but in 2002, in lieu of any substantive hearings, further action was dismissed due to the time delay in bringing proceedings.

André Hanscombe later wrote a book titled The Last Thursday in July about his life with Nickell, coping with the homicide, and life with their son afterwards. In 1996, he moved with their child to France, driven abroad, according to notes in his book, by media intrusion. He was strongly critical of some of the reporters who tracked him and his son down to his "sanctuary" in the French countryside.

IPCC findings
Following an investigation, the Independent Police Complaints Commission (IPCC) released a report, dated 3 June 2010, into the actions of the Metropolitan Police Force and their handling of the murder investigation. It described a "catalogue of bad decisions and errors" by the Metropolitan Police which had resulted in Napper being free to kill Nickell. It said that officers missed a series of opportunities to take him off the streets and suggested the lives of Samantha Bisset and her four-year-old daughter, Jazmine, would also have been saved if police had acted on tip-offs, including one by Napper's mother.

Rachel Cerfontyne of the IPCC said that police failed to investigate the 1989 report that he attacked a woman on Plumstead Common in London and no record of the telephone call can be found. She said, "It is clear that throughout the investigations into the 'Green Chain' rapes and Rachel Nickell's death there was a catalogue of bad decisions and errors made by the Metropolitan Police. The police failed to sufficiently investigate after Napper's mother called police to report that he had confessed to her that he had raped a woman and, inconceivably, they eliminated Napper from inquiries into the Green Chain rapes because he was over 6 feet tall. Without these errors, Robert Napper could have been off the streets before he killed Rachel Nickell and the Bissets, and before numerous women suffered violent sexual attacks at his hands". Detectives had decided to exclude anyone over 6 feet based on the description of a 5' 7" rapist; however, there were conflicting witness reports of the rapist's height, and Napper walked with a stoop. The IPCC said no police officer would face disciplinary action because they had all retired and one key senior detective had died. Criminal prosecutions were not considered.

In popular culture
Deceit – 2021 British television mini-series

See also
Murder of Penny Bell – unsolved 1991 murder in London that was once linked to Nickell's 
Murder of Alison Shaughnessy – another high-profile stabbing of a young woman in London in 1991, 2½ miles from the site of Nickell's stabbing. The murder remains unsolved.

References

Further reading
 Laurence J. Alison, Marie Eyre: Killer in the Shadows: The Monstrous Crimes of Robert Napper. Pennant Books 2009, .
 Kevin Brewer: Psychology and Crime. Heinemann Educational Publishers 2000, .
 Paul Britton: The Jigsaw Man. Corgi Books 1998, .
 Colin Evans: A Question of Evidence: The Casebook of Great Forensic Controversies, from Napoleon to O.J. Wiley 2002, .
 Mike Fielder: The Murder of Rachel Nickell. John Blake 2000, .
 Alex Handscombe: Letting Go: A true story of murder, loss and survival by Rachel Nickell's son. Harper Element 2017, .
 André Hanscombe: The Last Thursday in July. Century 1996 / Arrow 1997, .
 David Kessler: Rachel Nickell, House of Solomon Ltd, 2001, .
 Keith Pedder: The Rachel Files, John Blake 2002, .
 Keith Pedder: Murder on the Common: The Secret Story of the Murder That Shocked a Nation. John Blake 2003, .
 Colin Stagg, David Kessler: Who Really Killed Rachel? Greenzone Publishing 1999, .
 Colin Stagg, David Kessler: The Lizzie James Conspiracy. House of Solomon 2001, .
 Colin Stagg, Ted Hynds: Pariah: Colin Stagg. Pennant Publishing 2007, .
 Brent E. Turvey: Criminal Profiling: An Introduction to Behavioral Evidence Analysis Academic Press 2002, .

External links
 The Rachel Nickell Case

1990s murders in London
1992 crimes in the United Kingdom
1992 in London
Deaths by stabbing in London
Deaths by person in London
History of mental health in the United Kingdom
History of the London Borough of Merton
Incidents of violence against women
July 1992 crimes
July 1992 events in the United Kingdom
Manslaughter in London
Violence against women in England
Wimbledon, London